The Marijuana Justice Act (S.597) was a 2019 bill to remove cannabis from the Controlled Substances Act, sponsored by U.S. Senator Cory Booker. An identical bill, H.R.1456, was introduced in the House of Representatives. The bill was co-sponsored by a number of contenders for the Democratic Party's nomination for U.S. President in the 2020 election, including Kamala Harris, Elizabeth Warren, Kirsten Gillibrand, Michael Bennet, and Bernie Sanders. In February 2019, it was referred to the Committee on the Judiciary. An identically titled bill had been introduced by Senator Booker in the 2017–2018 Congress and was called "among the most notable efforts" around legalization in that session. Besides removing cannabis from the Controlled Substances Act, the bill also sought to set up a community reinvestment fund, provide for expungement of past drug convictions, and penalize states that enforce cannabis laws disproportionately (regarding race or income status).

Legislative history
 115th Congress (2017–2018):  and 
 116th Congress (2019–2020):  and

References

Sources

Further reading

 as PDF

External links
All Info - S.597 - 116th Congress (2019-2020): Marijuana Justice Act of 2019

2019 cannabis law reform
Proposed legislation of the 115th United States Congress
Proposed legislation of the 116th United States Congress
Cannabis in the United States
Cory Booker